DCL or  may refer to:
 650 in Roman numerals, see 650 (disambiguation)

Computers 
 Data Center Linux, see Open Source Development Labs
 Data Control Language, a subset of SQL
 Dialog Control Language, a language and interpreter within AutoCAD
 DIGITAL Command Language, the command language used by most of the operating systems from the former Digital Equipment Corporation (DEC), now owned by Hewlett-Packard (HP)
 Double-checked locking, a software design pattern
 .dcl, source code files for Clean (programming language)
 .dcl, Delphi Control Library files for Embarcadero Delphi

Military
 Char de dépannage DNG/DCL, armoured recovery vehicle

Degrees 
 Doctor of Canon Law, for studies of canon law of the Roman Catholic Church
 Doctor of Civil Law, an alternative to the Doctor of Laws (LL.D.) degree

Organizations 
 Data Connection Ltd, a former name of Metaswitch
 Detroit College of Law, now known as the Michigan State University College of Law
 Disney Cruise Line, a cruise line company (United States)

Places 
 Deep Creek Lake State Park, a Maryland state park in Garrett County, United States

Science, technology, and medicine 
 DCL Technology Demonstrator programme, a torpedo detection system (U.K.)
 Device for Connection of Luminaires, a European plug and socket system for connecting lighting equipment 
 DICER-like, family of plant genes
 Direct coal liquefaction
 Deuterium chloride, DCl, a form of hydrogen chloride using deuterium atoms

Sports and games 
 Dual County League, a high school athletic conference in Massachusetts, United States
 Drone Champions League, a drone racing league